Delmiro Gouveia is a municipality located in the westernmost point of the Brazilian state of Alagoas. Its population is 52,262 (2020) and its area is 609 km².

The municipality holds part of the  Rio São Francisco Natural Monument, which protects the spectacular canyons of the São Francisco River between the Paulo Afonso Hydroelectric Complex and the Xingó Dam.

References

Municipalities in Alagoas
Populated places established in 1952
1952 establishments in Brazil